Dübendorf is a municipality in the district of Uster in the canton of Zürich in Switzerland.

It is a suburb of Zürich in Switzerland with a population of about 30,000 (2021).  It is the fourth largest city in the canton, after Zürich, Winterthur, and Uster.

History

Dübendorf is first mentioned in 946 as Tuobilindorf. On the northeastern side of the Adlisberg the ruins of the Dübelstein castle are situated; from 1487 to 1489 the home of Hans Waldmann, former mayor of the city of Zürich.

Geography
 
Of this area, 37.6% is used for agricultural purposes, while 19.5% is forested. Of the rest of the land, 41.9% is settled (buildings or roads) and the remainder (1%) is non-productive (rivers, glaciers or mountains).   housing and buildings made up 29.6% of the total area, while transportation infrastructure made up the rest (12.3%). Of the total unproductive area, water (streams and lakes) made up 1% of the area.

It is bisected by the Glatt river which runs from the Greifensee (Lake Greifen) which lies directly to the southeast. Dübendorf is located in the Glatt Valley (German: Glattal). Dübendorf is located on the northern side of the Adlisberg, as well, on a terrace on the northern side of the city of Zürich the hamlets Gockhausen and Geeren.

Demographics

, 28.2% of the population was made up of foreign nationals.   the gender distribution of the population was 49.2% male and 50.8% female. Over the last 10 years the population has grown at a rate of 10.5%. Most of the population speaks German  (81.8%), with Italian being second most common ( 4.5%) and Serbo-Croatian being third ( 2.1%).

In the 2007 election the most popular party was the SVP which received 39.1% of the vote.  The next three most popular parties were the CSP (17.5%), the SPS (16.1%) and the FDP (10.4%).

The age distribution of the population is children and teenagers (0–19 years old) make up 19.1% of the population, while adults (20–64 years old) make up 67.6% and seniors (over 64 years old) make up 13.3%. In Dübendorf about 73.6% of the population (between age 25-64) have completed either non-mandatory upper secondary education or additional higher education (either university or a Fachhochschule).  There are 10,786 households in Dübendorf.

 there were 7,733 Catholics and 7,553 Protestants in Dübendorf. In the 2000 census, religion was broken down into several smaller categories. Of the rest of the population, 6% were Muslim, 9.4% belonged to another religion (not listed), 4.6% did not give a religion, and 12.4% were atheist or agnostic.

The historical population is given in the following table:

For more up-to-date population figures:
http://www.duebendorf.ch/de/portrait/portraitfacts/factsbevoelkerung/

Industry

Dübendorf is the home of two research institutions that are part of the Swiss Federal Institute of Technology domain (ETH-Bereich):
Empa Empa is a materials science and technology research institution with 5 programs: Nanotechnology, Adaptive Materials Systems, The Healthy Human, Materials for Energy Technology and Technosphere - Atmosphere.
Eawag Eawag is the Swiss Federal Institute of Aquatic Science and Technology. There are a variety of topics researched at Eawag: Applied Aquatic Ecology, Chemical Pollutants, Environmental Engineering, Environmental Microbiology, Environmental Toxicology, Fish Ecology and Evolution, Limnology, Surface Waters, Systems Analysis/Integrated Assessment and Modeling, Urban Water Management, Water and Agriculture, Water and Sanitation in Developing Countries (SANDEC), and Water Resources and Drinking Water.

Givaudan, producer of flavors and fragrances, has a part of its R&D department located in Dübendorf. Hewlett Packard's main Switzerland office is in Dübendorf.

Dübendorf has an unemployment rate of 3.09%.  , there were 196 people employed in the primary economic sector and about 31 businesses involved in this sector.  2410 people are employed in the secondary sector and there are 234 businesses in this sector.  11663 people are employed in the tertiary sector, with 897 businesses in this sector.   76.1% of the working population were employed full-time, and 23.9% were employed part-time.

Education

The Primarschulverwaltung Dübendorf serves primary school students. The Sekundarschule Dübendorf-Schwerzenbach serves secondary level students. The Kantonsschule Uster in Uster has gymnasium education and serves Dübendorf.

The Lycée Français Marie Curie de Zürich (LFZ), a French international school, is located on four campuses in the municipality.

Places of interest

The town of Dübendorf is quite small and easy to get around on foot. Crossing from one side of the city to the other can be done within a half hour of casual walking. Apart from the city center and the river, an interesting place to visit is the museum of military aviation, displaying not just various military planes, but also various demonstration material (for instance, how helicopter control systems function) and two of the last original Junkers Ju 52 vintage aircraft in flying condition, which are used to provide sightseeing trips.

Transport
Dübendorf is served by both rail and bus links with the Zürich center (10 min), Winterthur (via Stettbach, 20 min) and other places in the canton of Zürich.

The military airport hosts one of the Rega bases. It currently is no longer used as the base of military jets.

Gallery

Notable people 

 Hans Waldmann (1435–1489), Mayor of Zurich, a military leader and Squire of Dubelstein
 Wilhelm Meyer-Lubke (1861–1936), philologist of the Neogrammarian school of linguistics
 Oskar Bider (1891–1919 in Dübendorf), aviation pioneer
 Ruedi Walter (1916–1990), comedian and actor
 Peter von Matt (born 1937), philologist and author, lives in Dübendorf
 Guerino Mazzola (born 1947), mathematician, musicologist, jazz pianist and author
 Michael Lammer (born 1982) a retired professional tennis player, lives in Dübendorf

See also 
 Solar Impulse

References

External links 

 Official website 
 

 
Cities in Switzerland
Municipalities of the canton of Zürich